For the athletics at the 2020 Summer Olympics competitions, the following qualification systems are in place. Qualification ended on 29 June 2021, but for marathon and 50 km race walking, it already ended on 31 May 2021. Some 1900 athletes, from 196 countries, will compete. 103 countries are qualified also through Universality places (initially 101, 61 men and 40 women).

Qualifying standards 
A National Olympic Committee (NOC) may enter up to 3 qualified athletes in each individual event if all athletes meet the entry standard during the qualifying period. An NOC may also enter a maximum of 1 qualified relay team per event. Under the universality rule, NOCs may enter one male athlete and one female athlete, regardless of time, if they have no athletes of that gender meeting the entry standard. This makes it possible for every NOC to have a minimum of two representatives in the sports. These universality spots cannot be used in the combined events, the 10,000 metres, or the 3,000 metre steeplechase.

The qualifying system for Tokyo 2020 saw fundamental changes from the previous Olympics. While the qualification from Rio 2016 and other previous editions relied on qualifying standards, Tokyo 2020 is primarily based on world ranking. World Athletics, the global sport governing body formerly known as IAAF until a name change in 2019, continues to set qualifying times, but these are "set for the sole purpose of qualifying athletes with exceptional performances unable to qualify through the World Athletics Rankings pathway." The number of entrants per event is capped, with different caps for different events varying from 24 athletes for the combined events to 80 (finally 110) athletes for the marathons.

The World Athletics Rankings are based on the average of the best five results for the athlete over the qualifying period. The results are weighted by the importance of the meet.

The qualifying standards may be obtained in various meets during the given period approved by the World Athletics. The qualifying period for the marathon and the 50 km race walk occurs from 1 January 2019 to 5 April 2020 and from 1 December 2020 to 31 May 2021 and the qualifying for the 10,000 m, 20 km race walk and combined events occurs from 1 January 2019 to 5 April 2020 and from 1 December 2020 to 29 June 2021, with the rest of the track and field events happening from 1 May 2019 to 5 April 2020 and from 1 December 2020 to 29 June 2021. The most recent Area Championships may be counted in the ranking, even if not during the qualifying period. On 6 April 2020, the World Athletics announced that the qualification period for the Games was suspended until 30 November 2020, in response to the coronavirus pandemic. In July 2020, World Athletics announced that the suspension period would be lifted for the road events (marathons and race walks) on 1 September 2020.

For the relays, a maximum of sixteen qualified NOCs shall be entitled to each event. The top eight teams in each event at the 2019 World Championships in Athletics (held in Doha from 28 September to 6 October 2019) guarantee a spot on their respective NOCs for the Olympics. The remaining half in each event are selected at the 2021 World Athletics Relays and according to World Athletics Top List as of 29 June 2021.

NOCs with more than three qualified athletes in an individual event may select, using their own rules, athletes from among those qualified. For example, the United States selects athletes based on the result of the 2020 United States Olympic Trials meet, but has a policy of entering every athlete qualified. Sweden only enters athletes good enough to reach at least the eighth position, based on an assessment by the Swedish NOC.

A tracking system of qualification is published by World Athletics: Road to 2020 Olympic Games. This Road to Tokyo tool shows which athletes – subject to being officially selected by their NOC – have qualified to compete. This tool identifies the first 3 qualifiers per country (in bold) but any athlete who has qualified, by Standard or Ranking, can be selected within the limit of 3 per nation. As this is a qualification monitoring tool, not an entry monitoring tool, it won't highlight which athletes have been officially selected by their NOC, but team announcements of many of the leading nations will be later published by World Athletics.

Some 1900 athletes, from more than 190 countries, will compete at the Olympic Games when the athletics will begin on 30 July.

The qualification period for all stadium events finished on 29 June and the qualification system has now been finalised, showing that about 70% of the athletes in individual events have qualified by entry standard and 30% by world ranking position, while 101 universality places have been awarded.

As already reported when the qualification closed for the longer road events, the men's and women's marathon exceeded their event quotas. This is also the case in the men's and women's 10,000m and the women's triple jump. No ranking place was necessary to complete the field in the men's shot put. But in those cases, regardless of the events’ quotas, any athlete with a qualification standard will still be eligible for selection to compete in Tokyo.

Sebastian Coe, president of World Athletics, said: “Olympic qualification processes are always a bit fraught because there's so much on the line for the athletes, but it's exciting to see the Olympic fields take shape as the Tokyo Games approach, and it's pleasing to see that the extended qualifying process we put in place when the Games were postponed last year ultimately allowed more athletes to reach the entry standards”. “With Tokyo 2020 less than a month away, and this last milestone complete, anticipation is growing rapidly for what shapes as an extraordinary competition ahead, based on some of the performances we have seen this year. I'm delighted to see that more than 190 countries will be represented in athletics in Tokyo, reflecting the unmatched universality of our sport, and I look forward to seeing all those athletes competing at the Games from 30 July.”

Athletes must have been born before 1 January 2006 (that, be at least 16 years old at the end of 2021) to compete. Youth athletes (born in 2004 or 2005, age 16 or 17 at the end of 2021) cannot compete in the throwing events, combined events, marathons, race walks, or 10,000 metre events. Junior athletes (born in 2002 or 2003, age 18 or 19 at the end of 2021) may compete in any event but cannot compete in the marathons or the 50 kilometre race walk.

The World Athletics Qualifying Standards are as follows:

Track events

Men's track events

Men's 100 m 
Does not include indoor achievements or races with wind above 2.0 m/s.
Entry number: 56 (17 from ranking) + 28 Universality and 1 Invitational. Some sprinters, like Aaron Brown, have been withdrawn (see note #11).

Men's 200 m 

Entry number: 56.
Withdrawn after qualification by standard or ranking: Miguel Francis, Benjamin Azamati-Kwaku, Zharnel Hughes, Christophe Lemaitre, Mouhamadou Fall, Paulo André de Oliveira, Felipe Bardi dos Santos, Méba-Mickaël Zeze, Jeffrey John.

Men's 400 m 

Entry number: 48.

Men's 800 m 

Entry number: 48. No qualified by ranking.

Men's 1500 m 

Entry number: 45.

Men's 5000 m 

Entry number: 42.

Men's 10,000 m 

Entry number: initial target of 27. 28 runners, one more, originally qualified by entry standard. However, two athletes withdrew, reducing the field to 26 athletes.

Men's 110 m hurdles 
Do not include indoor achievements. Entry number: 40.

Men's 400 m hurdles 
Entry number: 40.

Men's 3000 m steeplechase 
Entry number: 45.

Women's track events

Women's 100 m 
Does not include indoor achievements.

Women's 200 m

Women's 400 m

Women's 800 m

Women's 1500 m

Women's 5000 m

Women's 10,000 m 
The initial target for Entry standard (27) has been exceeded.

Women's 100 m hurdles 
Does not include indoor achievements

Women's 400 m hurdles

Women's 3000 m steeplechase

Road events

Men's road events

Men's marathon 
Qualification ended on 31 May 2021. Both marathons had a target number of 80 athletes, but a larger number of athletes fulfilled the qualifying criteria and competed in Sapporo, the venue of the Olympic road events. In the men's field, 106 athletes qualified (maximum three per nation).

Men's 20 km walk 
Entry number: 60.

Men's 50 km walk 

The qualification period ended on 31 May 2021. The entry standard was 3:50:00. The target number was 60 athletes (with a maximum of three per nation) and 38 athletes met the entry standard, leaving 22 places for athletes qualifying by world ranking.

Women's road events

Women's marathon 

Qualification ended on 31 May 2021. Both marathons had a target number of 80 athletes, but a larger number of athletes fulfilled the qualifying criteria and competed in Sapporo, the venue of the Olympic road events. In the women's field 91 athletes qualified (maximum three per nation): 
By Entry Standard: 89
By Finishing Position at Designated Competitions: 1
By World Rankings Position, to complete the required entry number of 80: 0
By Universality Places: 1

Women's 20 km walk

Field events

Men's field events

Men's high jump 

Entry number: 33.

Men's pole vault 

Entry number: 33.

Men's long jump 

Entry number: 32.

Men's triple jump 

Entry number: 32.

Men's shot put 

Entry number: 32. No ranking necessary to complete the field.

Men's discus throw 

Entry number: 32.

Men's hammer throw 

Entry number: 32.

Men's javelin throw 

Entry number: 32.

Women's field events

Women's high jump

Women's pole vault

Women's long jump

Women's triple jump 

No athlete qualified by world ranking.

Women's shot put

Women's discus throw

Women's hammer throw

Women's javelin throw

Combined events

Men's decathlon 

Entry number: 24.

Women's heptathlon

Relay events 
World Athletics press release

Each relay team will be composed of 5 athletes (4 athletes for the mixed teams, 2 men and 2 women). Athletes already qualified for the 100 m and 400 m events are automatically included in their respective relay teams.

Men's 4 × 100 m relay 

Entry number: 16 teams of 5 athletes each (80).
By Finishing Position at Designated Competitions: 12
By Top List: 4 (all marks made in 2019).

Men's 4 × 400 m relay 

Entry number: 16 teams of 5 athletes each (80).

Women's 4 × 100 m relay

Women's 4 × 400 m relay

Mixed 4 × 400 m relay 

Entry number: 16 teams of 4 athletes each, 2 men and 2 women (64).

See also
Athletics at the 2020 Summer Paralympics - Qualification

Notes

 On 22 May 2021, 23 more athletes were granted ANA status, followed by another 35 on 7 June.

References

Qualification for the 2020 Summer Olympics
Qualification